Baron Emmanuel Pierre Marie Ghislain de Bethune (18 July 1930 – 4 November 2011) was a Belgian politician. He was the Mayor of Kortrijk from 1987 to 1989 and again from 1995 to 2000. He went on to found the Bethune Foundation, a foundation used to preserve the library collections of the Bethune family.

Bethune died on 4 November 2011, aged 81. He is survived by his four children including his daughter, the current Belgian Senate President, Sabine de Bethune.

References

1930 births
2011 deaths
Mayors of Kortrijk
Place of birth missing
Place of death missing
Belgian Roman Catholics
Flemish nobility